Undocumented youth in the United States are young people living in the United States without U.S. citizenship or other legal immigration status. An estimated 1.1 million undocumented minors resided in the U.S. as of 2010, making up 16% of the undocumented population of 11 million. Undocumented students face unique legal uncertainties and limitations within the United States educational system. They are sometimes called the 1.5 generation (as opposed to first- or second-generation), as they have spent a majority of their lives in the United States.

Children have the legal right to public a K–12 education regardless of immigration status due to the 1982 US Supreme Court ruling in Plyler v. Doe. After navigating through primary education, undocumented youth transition into an adulthood that does not grant them those provisions. Although some undocumented students find their way to legal status, many remain undocumented.

It has been noted that many undocumented youth experience a period of adapting to a new identity (being "illegal") that is stigmatized and unexpected. Coming of age, many undocumented youth become negatively distinguished from their former peers because of their inability to work legally, obtain a driver's license, or participate in post-secondary education. These limitations with regards to citizenship frequently prove to be obstacles to the youth's opportunity for social and civic engagement.

DACA (Deferred Action for Childhood Arrivals) is a program that gives undocumented individuals the ability to be legally present in the United states, giving them a SSN and a work permit. As of June 18, 2020, the Supreme Court has ruled that the Trump Administration cannot legally repeal the program, writing that the "DHS’s decision to rescind DACA was arbitrary and capricious."

Undocumented students
Undocumented students may not know how to navigate the higher education system in their state and often leads to students not attending college.  Undocumented students might assume that it is out of their financial means or not available to them due to their residency status.  This leaves undocumented students in a vulnerable place because they are not gaining the educational experience and are not eligible for legal work. According to the US: The Human Rights of Dreamers, Also that Undocumented students should be secured while they live in the United States. The only way the child entered the United States is by their parents. Some people believe they shouldn't be penalized for their parents actions.  Others believe they shouldn't be allowed to benefit from the unlawful actions of their parents.  Also there are not a lot of immigrants eligible for the Dream Act. According to Undocumented Undergraduates and the Criminal States of Immigration Reform, Undocumented students still have a lot of challenges while attending college in the United States. A lot of undocumented students have issues with certain people they can trust within their community. Based on their status of being considered an alien in the United States they feel secluded. Undocumented immigrants feel as though they don't belong in the United States that because of how people treat them.

Undocumented immigrants, particularly students, are a difficult subgroup of the population to research; there is not much current statistical data available. As a result of their precarious legal and social situation, these people are hesitant to identify themselves as being unauthorized, and the process of estimating statistics and drawing conclusions can be lengthy and cumbersome. While exact numbers are not known, there has been an increased emphasis on the challenges facing undocumented students nationwide.

Demographics
It is difficult to determine national statistics for the demographic makeup of undocumented students. However, it can be inferred that statistics for undocumented students would be very closely related to those for the unauthorized immigrant population as a whole. Since 2014, approximately 11.1 million such immigrants live in the United States, which has seen only a small increase since 2007. Approximately 17%, roughly two million, of these immigrants are under the age of 18, about 65 thousand graduate from high school each year, and only 5–10% of them continue to higher education.

While the undocumented student population comes from all over the world, a majority come from Mexico and other Central American countries, with approximately 6.7 million came from Mexico. The second-largest sending region is Asia. In 2012, the Philippine undocumented population in the U.S. consisted of approximately 310,000 people and there were 260,000 such immigrants from India. Although often left out of the conversation, Asian and Pacific Islanders are a significant population in the undocumented community.  The cultural expectations of immigrants in these communities often influence a more silenced and hidden existence than other cultures. There tends to be a heavier stigma against those who are undocumented, even within the culture.

Education access
Public schooling allows undocumented youth to assimilate into society. Youth from K-12 are protected by the Family Educational Rights and Privacy Act. This specific act prevents schools from releasing any information from students' records to immigration authorities.  Graduation for these youth serves as a traumatic change in status and identity from student to "illegal alien" and "illegal worker". This "state of shock" causes depressed motivation and financial anxiety causing youth to drop out of high school. 40 percent of undocumented adults ages 18–24 do not complete high school. Of those that complete high school, only 49 percent attend college. Many youths reported a feeling of falling through the cracks, instances where they were not able to get assistance from their educational institutions.  The inability to receive federal and state student financial aid, as well as low family incomes, limits access for undocumented youth to attend post secondary schooling. In 2006, Hispanic youth had the lowest educational attainment out of any ethnic or racial group. Parents can often not provide financial assistance and immigrant youths carry financial burden within their households.

Access to a college education can help improve the status of undocumented youth. Graduating college allows youth to improve labor market skills and makes them eligible for jobs where employers might potentially sponsor a temporary legal visa. A college education also increases youth marriageability increasing the chances for youth to marry a legal citizen and obtain legal status through familial relationship. The majority of undocumented children are growing up with legal access to public education but face legal barriers to higher education (Abrogate, 2006). Abrogate interviewed a girl named Alisa who came to the United States at the age of five from Guatemala; she encountered the difficulties of higher education. She was a student who excelled academically in high school and was admitted to the University of California. Alisa became disheartened due to her status and was unable to be given financial aid. Some researchers explain that undocumented children face an economic barrier when pursuing a higher education and find that because of this they are unable to attend a University (Abrogate; Shields and Bergman, 2004; Gonzales, 2011; Crossness and Turkey, 2011). Due to this, The Dream Act was proposed to the Senate and the House of Representatives and was only 13 states that include California, Connecticut, Illinois, Kansas, Maryland, Nebraska, New Mexico, New York, Oklahoma, Texas, Utah, Washington, and Wisconsin passed their state laws. These states allow undocumented children to pay in-state tuition based on their attendance and graduation from a state high school (Schmidt 2013).

Higher education
The Pew Hispanic Center estimates that 1.5 million undocumented students currently reside in the United States.  Of these students, about 765,000 arrived in the United States before turning sixteen. It is also estimated that there were 360,000 undocumented high school graduates between the ages of eighteen and twenty-four in the United States in 2006.  However, it is estimated that each year only 5 to 10 percent of undocumented high-school graduates—about 65,000 nationwide—are eligible to attend college. In 2005, only about 50,000 undocumented students enrolled in U.S. colleges and universities.  Of these college students, 18,000 were enrolled in California community colleges in the 2005-2006 school year as a result of financial accessibility. According to Roberto Gonzalez, Professor of Sociology at the University of Washington, "Given the opportunity to receive additional education and move into better-paying jobs, undocumented students would pay more in taxes and have more money to spend and invest in the U.S. economy."

Admission & enrollment
There is no federal law that prohibits the admission of undocumented immigrants to U.S. colleges and universities, public or private, nor does federal law require students to prove citizenship in order to enter U.S. institutions of higher education.  However, every institution has its own policies on admitting undocumented students. For example, following a 2003 recommendation by the state attorney general, many 4-year state colleges in Virginia require applicants to submit proof of citizenship or legal residency, and refuse admission to students without documentation.  This policy is not, however, a state law. South Carolina and Alabama, do not allow undocumented students to apply to public universities

Tuition and financial aid
As of 2015, there were 11 million unauthorized immigrants in the United States, a small decline from the Pew Research Center's estimate of 11.3 million for 2009.  In 2014, about 3.9 million students in kindergarten through 12th grade in U.S. public and private schools were children of unauthorized immigrants.  While 3.2 million of this population were U.S. born, approximately 725,000 or 1.3% were unauthorized students themselves and potentially not receiving the financial resources they need to pursue higher education in the United States.

Programs such as the Deferred Action for Childhood Arrivals (DACA) create open space for undocumented students to qualify for post secondary education benefits discussed in policies such as IIRIRA.  The language in PRWORA, still bars DACA recipients to receive public benefits since they are not "qualified aliens".  The language in both PRWORA and IIRIRA are vague enough that they allow states to decide how to address tuition rates and state financial aid for their students.  Although many states use these statutes as the reason to deny federal and state financial aid many others argue that the definition of public benefits does not include offering in-state tuition to undocumented students.

There is no federal or state law that prohibits the admission of these immigrants to U.S. colleges and universities, but instead, non permanent residents and undocumented students are treated differently from one state to the next, resulting in no cohesive process and potential confusion for undocumented students.  Research has found that immigrant students lack information about financing college and are thus less likely to apply for and take advantage of student loans.  With access to the necessary information, support, and financial resources, however, higher education – and the opportunities that come with it – is certainly a viable option for undocumented students.

According to the u Lead Network, as of 2017, there are 16 states that offer in-state tuition rates to undocumented students who meet specific criteria, with several of these offering state-funded financial aid as well:

In addition to these 16 states, Hawaii, Michigan, Oklahoma, and Rhode Island allow this through the school system, their Board of Regents. Virginia only allows in-state tuition for DACA students.

While some states opt to pass their own legislation allowing in-state tuition for undocumented students, it does not fully bridge the gap for financial aid. Some states, like Georgia, have worked against education for undocumented students by forbidding enrollment in some colleges.

Outside of the aforementioned states offering state financial aid, undocumented students are not eligible for federal financial aid, which makes the cost of tuition and fees an even greater obstacle to higher education.  Undocumented students must rely primarily on private scholarships as a source of funding for their postsecondary education. There are a few private scholarships that do not require the student to be a U.S. citizen or resident or have a social security number in order to apply. The Mexican American Legal Defense and Education Fund (MALDEF) maintains the most comprehensive listing of such scholarships.

Private colleges and universities set their own financial aid policies. Some offer financial aid in the form of grants and scholarships to undocumented students.

Additional barriers
Understanding how to navigate the higher education labyrinth is a learned social practice, a skill acquired through social networks, parent understanding, and access to the information.  The opportunities to learn about college access is inequitably taught to undocumented students. Undocumented students face many challenges in their pre-collegiate years that can inhibit their knowledge to access to higher education in the future.  Most undocumented students come from working class or working poor families, which often forces them to live in communities where they become vulnerable to crimes, poor housing conditions, high unemployment, and underperforming schools Many of the schools they attend face high teacher turnover, overcrowding, and inadequate teacher preparation.  Many of the students are placed into language development courses, which often do not provide the rigorous coursework needed for college preparation. These students also may struggle with their schoolwork due to the discontinuity in their education.  Some students arrive in the United States after attending schools in their country of birth.  Adjusting to the education system in the United States can be a challenge for students. Some may be behind because their previous schools were not teaching the same curriculum or if their schools were ahead of the curriculum, students might lose interest in their new schools. Undocumented students can also struggle with their need to contribute money to their household.  Some students work as migrant farmers alongside their parents, this economic need can set them back in their education and in their path to understanding the steps to higher education. All of these things can inhibit undocumented students from successfully preparing for higher education.

Another barrier undocumented students face in their access to higher education is the lack of resources and adequate support from school professionals.  Many school professionals—teachers, counselors, other personnel—are not always aware of their state's policies regarding admission, tuition and financial aid for undocumented students.  Some school professionals are even unaware which students on their campus are undocumented. School professionals, often, do not receive training about policies that affect students and some have acknowledged that they only learned because of interactions with students or what they have learned through the media. Some undocumented students, who have been surveyed regarding their educational experience, claimed to feel as if they "lucked out", having someone to mentor them in college access. Unfortunately, not all students feel this way.  Although some students do acknowledge having an influential teacher or college counselor, many students feel unsupported or feel as they were given incorrect information.

Having college access information available to support undocumented students is not only a tool that undocumented students can use for themselves, it is information that they can then pass down to others.  Many parents of undocumented students do not have the knowledge to help their child pursue higher education, but these families have strong family networks, and with accurate information, students will then be able to share it with the younger children in their networks.  If community groups and school professionals reach out to undocumented students in ways that work within their culture, these students can have in increased chance of attending higher education.

Employment and transitions into adulthood
Youth brought to the United States as adolescents are at greater risk for adjustment difficulties. Many undergo acculturated distress; poor mental health, depression, anxiety, a feeling of alienation, and identity confusion. Markers in the transition into adulthood, such as finding work, applying for college, and obtaining a driver's license, all require legal status to obtain. Youth undergo three transition periods as they enter into adulthood; discovery, learning to be undocumented, and coping. The first, discovery (ages 16–18) is the time where youth first discover that they are undocumented. Within this period, key transitional markers such as obtaining a driver's license and applying for college are experienced. These markers often become the first time many youth learn that they are undocumented.  The second period, learning to be undocumented (ages 18–24) is a series of life alterations in which youth learn to live as an undocumented immigrant. This includes finding work as an undocumented immigrant and postponing secondary education. The third, coping (ages 25–29) is adjusting to lower expectations and realizing the true limits of their rights. This leads many youth to follow into the same job pool as their undocumented parents.

This gap still exists between higher education and financial aid for undocumented students. Since undocumented students are not eligible for most forms of financial aid, merit scholarships are not feasible as they are most often restrict their eligibility to U.S. citizens or permanent residents. Undocumented students are not eligible for federal aid, thus, benefits that come from FAFSA or Pell Grants do not apply to these students.  Most state-based aid is also out of reach for undocumented students so grants, work study and loans are not options. States opt to pass their own legislation allowing in-state tuition for undocumented students; while this is an important step for undocumented students, it does not fully bridge the gap for financial aid. Some states, like Georgia, have worked against education for undocumented students by forbidding enrollment in some colleges. Statistics show $11.8 billion in taxes each year comes from undocumented immigrants (Tax Contributions). Findings also show that there would be an $845 million in tax revenue with the Obama Administration's executive action that includes the implementation of DACA and its expansion. These findings also show that a full immigration reform would increase tax revenue by $2.2 billion (Tax Contributions). Giving these groups the availability for higher education aid would only increase these benefits through their consumption and investment in the economy.

Engagement of Undocumented Students
Even though there are several barriers undocumented students encounter in higher education, they continue to have high academic aspirations. A quantitative study described that Latino students see higher education as a road to better themselves. Their stories of aspirations are geared towards helping others and giving back to their community. Giving back helps to affirm their social citizenship, existence, and validates their access to higher education.

Educational institutions play a role in promoting civic engagement among students. When schools provide volunteer opportunities and require community service to graduate, there's a higher chance that students will civically engaged after graduation. In a qualitative study, Munoz found that undocumented female Mexican college students expressed frustration, helplessness, and fear because of their lack of legal status. However, they also disclosed being very involved in college extracurricular activities to feel a sense of belonging and validation. Munoz's  qualitative study also indicates that 40% of undocumented students chose to be involved by participating in community service or mentoring activities to assist undocumented youth like themselves.

Due to their unclear legal status, some youth do generate feelings of being an outsider and dissociate from civic engagement. Through an online survey of open-ended questions, Perez, Espinoza, Ramos, Coronado, and Cortes  reported that in elementary school, 38% of undocumented students were civically engaged. In middle school, rates increased to 41%. In high school, 73% participated in civic engagement with 34% reporting spending more than 40 hours per year doing volunteer work. Also, 7% participated in social services, 3% were engaged in activism, 29% tutored other students, and 55% operated administrative work. In general, 86% of all respondents also participated in extracurricular activities during high school. In addition to college, 55% participated in some form of civic engagement. Even though undocumented Latino students had a high percentage in civic engagement, they also reported higher levels of feeling rejection because of their undocumented status. Ultimately, Perez, Espinoza, Ramos, Coronado, and Cortes  identified feelings of rejection were not correlated with lack of involvement and that most undocumented Latino youth going to college are engaging in U.S. civic life.

Undocumented youth change and acculturate to multiple circumstances that surround them by studying hard, following the codes of conduct, and acting as good citizens of the United States. Chang, Torrez, Ferguson, and Sagar  conducted a qualitative study of 18 students, ages 18 and above, who identified as undocumented or were once undocumented, They found that students often had to be involved ad engaged in the community to feel accepted. Undocumented students navigate the best they could between social and cultural intrusions. Students often create a foundation to keep moving forward and not give up by taking advantage of their community cultural wealth as a mechanism to keep hope.

Even though there are political restrictions for undocumented students to self-advocate, multiple students remained hopeful because they stood by the ideal cultural citizenship even if it seemed unattainable. Chang, Torrez, Ferguson, and Sagar's  study showed that participants' process of interpreting, integrating, and interjecting themselves as valuable objects with hope that even from their socially and social positions they strongly engaged in different cultural worlds to achieve the American dream. Undocumented students keep high aspirations and participate in civil engagement, disregarding the barriers they may face due to their undocumented status in the United States.

Youth activism

In recent years, undocumented youth have gathered to lobby for legislative action. Organizations such as the Education Not Deportation (END) Our Pain Organization have been established to demand moratorium for youth eligible for the Development, Relief, Education for Alien Minors (DREAM Act) Act which would grant conditional legal status to those brought here under the age of 16 if they attend college or join the military.  Throughout 2009 and 2010, a number of sit-ins, hunger strikes, marches, and social media campaigns were conducted by many activist organizations. United We Dream organized 500 youth to participate in a National DREAM Act graduation in Washington combined with 15 more ceremonies nationwide. Between September and December 2010 pro-immigrant groups generated over 840,000 call, faces, and emails in favor of the DREAM Act, as well as 81,000 petitions delivered to targeted Senate offices. Youth activists often invoke a feeling of coming out, relating to the same action experienced by the LGBTQ community, to protest for protection of their rights despite threats of arrest, imprisonment, and deportation.

Legislation affecting undocumented students

Plyler v. Doe

In the United States, children are given the right to an elementary and secondary education (K-12) regardless of their immigration status.

Plyler v. Doe, 457 U.S. 202 (1982), was a case in which the Supreme Court of the United States struck down a state statute denying funding for education to undocumented immigrant children. The case simultaneously struck down a municipal school district's attempt to charge such immigrants an annual $1,000 tuition fee to compensate for state funding. The Court found that where states limit the rights afforded to people (specifically children) based on their status as immigrants, this limitation must be examined under an intermediate scrutiny standard to determine whether it furthers a substantial goal of the State.

Prior to 1975, all students in Texas were able to attend public elementary and secondary school. The state government provided funding to schools based on the number of students enrolled. In May 1975, the state legislature amended the Texas Education Code to provide that only U.S. citizens or lawfully admitted non citizens would be counted for financial aid purposes.  Schools were given the option to allow or reject undocumented students and to charge tuition if they chose to accept them. School officials in Tyler, Texas, under the direction of Superintendent James Plyler, began charging $1,000 annual tuition to all undocumented students—about 60 from a student body of 1,600.  In September 1977, the Mexican American Legal Defense and Educational Fund (MALDEF) filed a class action on behalf of sixteen Mexican undocumented students of the Tyler district.

The trial court found that the Texas law violated the Equal Protection Clause of the Fourteenth Amendment to the United States Constitution because it amounted to a total deprivation of education without a rational basis. The court rejected the state's arguments regarding the cost of educating undocumented children, finding that the federal government largely subsidized the additional costs that the education of these children entailed and that "it is not sufficient justification that a law saves money".

In order to comply with Plyler, education policy analysts have suggested that schools may not:
deny admission to a student on the basis of undocumented status;
treat a student fundamentally differently from others when determining residency;
engage in practices that frighten undocumented students and their families away from school access;
require students or parents to disclose or document immigration status;
make inquiries of students or parents that may expose their undocumented status;
require Social Security numbers from any student.

Plyler does not extend to post secondary education, but at least guarantees undocumented students the opportunity to receive a high school degree.

Deferred Action for Childhood Arrivals (DACA)

On June 15, 2012, the Department of Homeland Security (DHS) announced the executive (President Obama and his administration) decision to defer immigration enforcement for undocumented youth who meet specific requirements set under the Deferred Action for Childhood Arrivals (DACA) plan. This order provided temporary relief from immigration enforcement and deportation proceedings, as well as the authorization to work.  In Janet Napolitano's memorandum to the U.S. Customs and Border Patrol, U.S. Citizenship and Immigration Services, and U.S. Immigration and Customs Enforcement, the Secretary of Homeland Security stated that immigration laws should be enforced sensibly and with consideration to the individual situation. In the case for these young people living in the U.S, she stated that they had no intent on breaking any law and should have the opportunity to be productive people in this country.

Individuals may request DACA if they meet the following requirements:
Under the age of 31 as of June 15, 2012 (at least 15 years or older at the time of application);
Came to the United States before the age of 16;
Have continuously lived in the United States since June 15, 2007, up to the present time;
Were physically present in the United States on June 15, 2012, and at the time of making your request for consideration of deferred action with USCIS;
Had no lawful status on June 15, 2012;
Are currently in school, have graduated or obtained a certificate of completion from high school, have obtained a general education development (GED) certificate, or are an honorably discharged veteran of the Coast Guard or Armed Forces of the United States; and
Have not been convicted of a felony, significant misdemeanor, or three or more other misdemeanors, and do not otherwise pose a threat to national security or public safety.

Applicants who meet the guidelines are granted a two-year reprieve and are granted work authorization. An estimated 1.8 million undocumented youth are eligible for deferred action. As of August 2013, 557,000 immigrants applied for deferred action and 400,562 have been approved. In reaction to the executive order, some states such as Arizona and Nebraska announced that they would not prescribe state benefits such as granting driver's licenses to recipients. The majority of states announced that they would grant driver's licenses to recipients along with Michigan and Iowa who reversed their decisions to deny state benefits. Without permanent residence, youth granted deferred action still cannot receive federal financial aid. Access to secondary education is still limited, but youth who are granted the ability to work have the potential for increased wages and the ability to pay tuition costs.

According to the Migration Policy Institute, approximately two million people are eligible for the DACA program, as the programs rules currently stand.  In 2014 President Obama announced an expansion of DACA; removing the maximum age limit, changing the entry date to 2010, and extending the deferment period to three years. This extended program could potentially allow an additional 300 thousand people eligibility. As of 2016, the expansion was placed on hold due to a court injunction, in United States v. Texas.

DACA is sometimes seen as legislation that provides a pathway to citizenship or as a way of receiving lawful immigration status. Neither is true, the deferment only provides the qualified recipients to have a lawful presence, meaning the authorities cannot force them to leave the country although they still lack legal immigration status.  DACA statuses can be terminated or not renewed based on the discretion of DHS, as it is not a law.  DACA is a presidential executive authority, which also means that it can change based on future presidents.  DACA, therefore, creates open space for undocumented students to qualify for post secondary education benefits.

Immigration Reform and Immigrant Responsibility Act of 1996 (IIRIRA)
In 1996, Congress approved the Immigration Reform and Immigrant Responsibility Act of 1996 (IIRIRA) to improve immigration law in the United States. Section 505 of IIRIRA prohibits public higher education institutions from giving those who are unlawfully present in the United States post secondary education benefits, on the basis of residency in a State, that are not being given to U.S. citizens or nationals.

Personal Responsibility and Work Opportunity Reconciliation Act of 1996 (PRWORA)
The Personal Responsibility and Work Opportunity Reconciliation Act of 1996 (PRWORA) was President Bill Clinton's major welfare reform.  PRWORA is most known for the creation of the Temporary Assistance for Needy Family (TANF) program.  Additionally, PRWORA set the standards for how courts and institutions determined the eligibility of federal, state, and local benefits and services.  The reform states those who are not "qualified aliens" are ineligible for federal public benefits.  The act also gives states the discretionary power to determine the tuition rates publicly funded schools and the authority to provide state financial aid.  If states do not pass specific legislation regarding these matters then federal legislation superseded and inherently prohibits state financial aid for unauthorized immigrants.

DREAM Act

The Development, Relief and Education for Alien Minors (DREAM) Act is a federal bill that would permit states to determine state residency for higher education or military purposes. This bill was first introduced in the Senate on August 1, 2001, and was most recently re-introduced in Congress on March 26, 2009. A Senate filibuster blocked it on December 18, 2010.  It would provide a mechanism for undocumented students of good moral character to become legal permanent residents. The DREAM Act initially allowed beneficiaries to qualify for federal student aid but was changed in the 2010 version of the bill. In order to be eligible, individuals must have come to the U.S. as children (under the age of 16), graduated from a U.S. high school and be a long-term resident (at least 5 years). An age cap of 35 was also set. The latest version of the DREAM Act does not grant legal immigrant status to anyone for at least two years. Previous versions of the Act would have immediately granted legal immigrant status to eligible individuals. Many other limitations were also included in this latest version, among them the removal of access to healthcare benefits and limits to chain migration.

Notes

References

Further reading
 
 

Demographics of the United States
Illegal immigration to the United States
Youth in the United States